A list of films produced by the Israeli film industry in 1997.

1997 releases

Unknown premiere date

Awards

See also
1997 in Israel

References

External links
 Israeli films of 1997 at the Internet Movie Database

Israeli
Film
1997